Minna Grey (1877 in London, England – 1935) was an English actress of the silent era.

Death
Grey died in 1935, 2 days before her 59th birthday.

Selected filmography
 The Shulamite (1915)
 Just a Girl (1916)
 The Second Mrs. Tanqueray (1916)
 The Manxman (1917)
 The Happy Warrior (1917)
 Little Women (1917)
 The Sorrows of Satan (1917)
 The Elder Miss Blossom (1918)
 Onward Christian Soldiers (1918)
 Mrs. Thompson (1919)
 The Edge O' Beyond (1919)
 The Husband Hunter (1920)
 The Last Rose of Summer (1920)
 Dangerous Lies (1921)
 When We Were 21 (1921)
 All Roads Lead to Calvary (1921)
 If Four Walls Told (1922)
 Wee MacGregor's Sweetheart (1922)
 Afterglow (1923)
 The York Mystery (1924)
 A Daughter of Love (1925)
 Somebody's Darling (1925)
 The Woman in White (1929)

References

External links

1868 births
1935 deaths
20th-century English actresses
English silent film actresses
People from Blackburn